Abies yuanbaoshanensis is a species of fir tree in the family Pinaceae. It is found only in the Yuanbao Mountains within Guangxi province of China. It is a critically endangered species. It is estimated that only 700 trees exist, including saplings

References

Sources

yuanbaoshanensis
Endemic flora of China
Trees of China
Flora of Guangxi
Critically endangered flora of Asia
Taxonomy articles created by Polbot
Plants described in 1980